The Mornington Peninsula Nepean Football League (abbreviated "MPNFL") is an Australian rules football competition, governed by the AFL South East. The MPNFL contains teams near the south eastern region of Melbourne, Victoria, Australia. At the end of the 2017 season, the competition was restructured from a geographical to a divisional structure, with promotion/ relegation. It contains two divisions with 22 teams in all, 10 in Division 1 and 12 in Division 2.

History
The league was formed in 1987 upon the merger of the Mornington Peninsula FL and the Nepean FL. Football on the Peninsula region goes back to 1908, and in 2008 celebrated its centenary.

The first league, the Peninsula FA, was formed in 1908. This competition played until 1933, and then it merged with the Peninsula District FA (formed in 1920) to form the Mornington Peninsula FL for the 1934 season. Clubs from the small Peninsula Junior FL also joined.

In late 1958 the league's committee allowed Chelsea to transfer in from the Federal FL, couple with the fact the league was in the growth corridor of suburban Melbourne the league decided on a new approach to the competition. It would form a major and minor league competitions. A new Nepean League would be for clubs that only had one open age side. The Mornington Peninsula league would have both seniors and reserves competitions.

The 1958 league ran A, B, & C grade competitions with 28 teams from 18 clubs.
Some clubs were directed into the Nepean FL in 1959, and after a few years of promotion and relegation the two leagues merged in 1987.

The competition absorbed the South West Gippsland FL in 1995.

Division One 1987-94; Premier League 1995-2004; Peninsula League 2005–present
Division Two 1987-94; Southern Division 1995-98; Nepean Division 1999-2004; Nepean League 2005–present
Northern Division 1995-98; Peninsula Division 1999-2004; Casey-Cardinia League 2005–2014

At the end of 2014 the Casey-Cardinia division broke away to form their own competition.

At the end of 2017, it was announced that the divisions would be reworked into a two tier relegation-promotion system, with 10 teams in Division 1, and 12 in Division 2, with the premiers of Division 2 replacing the bottom placed team of Division 1.

Current Clubs

Division One

Division Two

Former Teams

Casey-Cardinia Division
Dingley Dingoes (moved to Southern FL at the end of the 2006 season)
Keysborough (moved to Southern FL at the end of the 2014 season)
Beaconsfield, Berwick, Cranbourne, Doveton, Hampton Park, Narre Warren, Pakenham, Rythdale-Officer-Cardinia & Tooradin-Dalmore formed the South East Football Netball League in 2015.

Nepean Division
 Carrum Downs Falcons (folded at the end of the 2005 season)

Recent Premierships

Peninsula Division/Division 1

Summary Of Division One/Premier League/Peninsula League Premierships since 1987:
 11 Frankston YCW
 5 Edithvale-Aspendale
 4 Mornington
 3 Pines
 3 Chelsea
 3 Seaford
1 Dromana
 1 Hastings
 1 Mount Eliza

Nepean Division/Division 2

Summary Of Division Two/Southern Division/Nepean Division/Nepean League Premierships since 1987:
 7 Sorrento
 4 Rosebud
 4 Langwarrin
 3 Pearcedale
 2 Dromana
 2 Frankston Bombers
 2 Hastings
 1 Berwick
 1 Carrum
 1 Crib Point
 1 Edithvale-Aspendale
 1 Frankston YCW
 1 Mount Eliza
 1 Red Hill
 1 Rye
 1 Tyabb

Casey-Cardinia Division

Summary Of Northern Division/Peninsula Division/Casey-Cardinia League Premierships since 1995:
 6 Narre Warren
 3 Beaconsfield
 2 Cranbourne
 2 Hampton Park
 2 Karingal
 2 Pakenham
 1 Chelsea
 1 Doveton
 1 Mount Eliza

References

External links
 Official website
 Full Points Footy -Mornington Peninsula Nepean Football League
 MPNFL Results/Fixture Page

 
Australian rules football competitions in Victoria (Australia)